Asphondylia artemisiae is a species of gall midge in the family Cecidomyiidae. The larvae of this species induce galls on at least one species of sagebrush Artemisia (plant). This species is only known from Arizona in the United States. It was first described by American entomologist Ephraim Porter Felt in 1908.

References

Cecidomyiinae
 Diptera of North America
 Gall-inducing insects
 Taxa named by Ephraim Porter Felt
Insects described in 1908